A belt buckle is a buckle, a clasp for fastening two ends, such as of straps or a belt, in which a device attached to one of the ends is fitted or coupled to the other.  The word enters Middle English via Old French and the Latin buccula or "cheek-strap," as for a helmet. Belt buckles and other fixtures are used on a variety of belts, including cingula, baltea, baldrics and later waist-belts.

Types 

Belt buckles go back at least to the Iron Age and a gold "great buckle" was among the items interred at Sutton Hoo. Primarily decorative "shield on tongue" buckles were common Anglo-Saxon grave goods at this time, elaborately decorated on the "shield" portion and associated only with men. One such buckle, found in a 7th-century grave at Finglesham, Kent during excavations by Sonia Chadwick Hawkes in 1964 bears the image of a naked warrior standing between two spears wearing only a horned helmet and belt.

Frame-style buckles are the oldest design. In a frame-and-prong buckle the prong attaches to one end of the frame and extends "away" from the wearer through a hole in the belt, where it anchors against the opposite side of the frame. The oldest styles have a simple loop or "D" shaped frame (see: D-ring), but "double-loop" or "center post" buckles whose prongs attach to a fixed center section appear in the 8th century. Very small buckles with removable center pins and chapes were introduced and used on shoes, beginning in the 17th century, but not often for waist-belts. A "chape" is the fixed cover or plate which attaches buckle to belt while the "mordant" or "bite" is the adjustable portion.

Plate-style buckles are common on western military belts of the mid-19th century, which often feature a three-hook clasp: two hooks fitting into one end of the belt and a third into the other. Officers might have a similar but more intricate clasp-style closure that featured two interlocking metal parts. In practice, the term "belt plate" refers to any flat, decorated surface on such a clasp. These precede development of modern "western-style" buckles, which feature a hinged frame affixed to one end of the belt and a simple hook clasp which enters the belt hole toward the wearer but leaves most of the buckle on the "outside" of the belt, providing an ample surface for decoration. The distance between the fixed frame or chape of a plate buckle and its adjustment prong is called the "throw."

Box-out buckles make the traditional belt seen today. Usually made with an enduring leather or other synthetic material as the band, these belt buckles are less functional but more fashionable. These belts became popular after Hollywood began using them in movies for their "fresh and new look." Now they dominate belt production, and are viewed as a more attractive belt.

Box-frame buckles are another, 20th-century style of military friction buckle, common on webbed belts. The box-frame buckle consists of three parts (front, back and post). An adjustable captive post sits perpendicular to the belt to press it against the outer "box," which completely surround the webbing and minimize accidental adjustments should part of the belt snag on something. There may or may not be a metal tip on the opposite "tongue" end of the belt for easier insertion.

O-Ring/D-Ring buckles use one or two rings to form the buckle. The belt is fastened by threading through the ring(s). This is used with braided, wedding, and canvas belts.

Snap/Side release buckles use male and female ends to snap together. They are more functional and often used for outdoor activities.

Earlier, military-style buckles often use friction and are designed for use with cloth belts or straps. Simple friction buckles are one-piece frames with no prong whatsoever, the strap or belt winding through a series of slots, and may more technically be called "belt slides" or "belt trims." Although technically not buckles, other fasteners such as plastic "side-clasp" or even seat belt latches are also often used on belts, and colloquially called buckles.

Rise in popularity 

Because of their strong association with military equipment, belt buckles were primarily a masculine ornament well into the 19th century.

Belt buckles became more popular as fashion accessories in the early 20th century, as the tops of trousers moved more toward the waist. "Western-style" belt buckles were largely popularized by cowboy movies in the United States and are often awarded to winners in rodeo events as prize medals or trophies, a custom later adopted by the Western States Endurance Run and a few other ultra-marathons. The large, flat surface of the western-style belt buckles make them a popular ornament or style of jewelry. Decorative "buckle sets" may contain a metal buckle, one or more matching loops which sit next to the buckle and a metal tip for the opposite, "tongue" end of the belt. "Belt plates" may be decorative covers for a plain buckle or other decorative fittings affixed to the belt itself, similar to "conchos" (from a Spanish word for "shell").  Decorative belt loops are sometimes awarded in scouting for participation in or completion of activities.

References

External links

 Roman Military Equipment: Cingulum and Balteus Retrieved 2010-07-17.
 Gold belt buckle from the ship-burial at Sutton Hoo, British Museum, Retrieved 2010-07-03.
 Belt buckle, Xiongnu type, 3rd–2nd century B.C.  Heilbrunn Timeline of Art History, The Metropolitan Museum of Art. Retrieved 2010-07-03.
 Michael J. O'Donnell and James Duncan Campbell. American Military Belt Plates, Third Edition.  Alexanderia VA: O'Donnell Publications, 2010. .
 Chris Marshall.  "Buckles Through the Ages", 2002. Retrieved 2010-07-20.

Belts (clothing)
Textile closures
2000s fashion